Leptophis modestus, commonly known as the cloud forest parrot snake, is a species of medium-sized slender snake of the family Colubridae. It is endemic to Mesoamerica. There are currently no recognized subspecies.

Geographic range
It can be found in southern Mexico, central Guatemala, northwestern El Salvador and southwestern Honduras.

Description

Dorsally, it is olive-green. There is a blackish streak behind each eye, and the lips and throat are yellowish. Ventrally, it is pale green.

The dorsal scales are arranged in 15 rows at midbody, strongly keeled except for the first row (adjacent to the ventrals) and on the tail.

Ventrals 171; anal plate divided; subcaudals 171, divided.

Habitat
L. modestus is an inhabitant of the cloud forests of Mesoamerica.

Conservation status
It is currently considered a threatened species. Habitat loss due to deforestation has led to a decrease in population numbers.

References

Further reading
 Günther, A. 1872. Seventh Account of new Species of Snakes in the Collection of the British Museum. Ann. Mag. Nat. Hist., Fourth Series 9:13-37. (Ahætulla modesta, p. 26 + Plate VI., figure C.)
 

Colubrids
Snakes of Central America
Reptiles of Mexico
Reptiles of Guatemala
Reptiles of El Salvador
Reptiles of Honduras
Reptiles described in 1872
Taxa named by Albert Günther